Maria Antonina Kazecka-Morgenrot (1880 in Załoźce – 26 May 1938 in Lviv) was a Polish poet and independence activist, best remembered for her poetry collections Kędy milczy słońce (1903), and Akwarelle (1904). She took part in the Battle of Lemberg in 1918, and was the recipient of the Cross of Valour in 1922, and the Cross of Independence in 1933.

References 

1880 births
1938 deaths
Polish poets
Polish activists